Asko Paade (born June 9, 1984) is an Estonian basketball player who last played for Estonian basketball team Tartu Ülikool.

He was also a member of Estonia national basketball team in 2003 – 2005.

Honours
 2002–03 Estonian Cup (Tartu Ülikool/Rock)
 2003–04 Estonian League (Tartu Ülikool/Rock)
 2004–05 Estonian Cup (Tartu Ülikool/Rock)
 2006–07 Estonian League (Tartu Ülikool/Rock)
 2007–08 Estonian League (Tartu Ülikool/Rock)
 2009–10 Estonian Cup (Tartu Ülikool/Rock)
 2009–10 Estonian League (Tartu Ülikool/Rock)
 2010–11 BBL Cup (Tartu Ülikool/Rock)
 2010–11 Estonian Cup (Tartu Ülikool/Rock)
 2011–12 Estonian Cup (Tartu Ülikool)

References

External links
Profile at bbl.net

1984 births
Living people
Estonian men's basketball players
Korvpalli Meistriliiga players
Tartu Ülikool/Rock players
Sportspeople from Tartu
Power forwards (basketball)